The Heaviest Corner on Earth is a promotional name given to the corner of 20th Street and 1st Avenue North in Birmingham, Alabama, United States, in the early 20th century. The name reflected the nearly simultaneous appearance of four of the tallest buildings in the South, the 10-story Woodward Building (1902), 16-story Brown Marx Building (1906), 16-story Empire Building (1909), and the 21-story American Trust and Savings Bank Building (1912).

The announcement of the last building was made in the Jemison Magazine in a January 1911 article titled "Birmingham to Have the Heaviest Corner in the South". Over the years, that claim was inflated to the improbable "Heaviest Corner on Earth", which remains a popular name for the grouping.

A marker, erected on May 23, 1985 by the Birmingham Historical Society, with cooperation from Operation New Birmingham, stands on the sidewalk outside the Empire Building describing the group.  The buildings have been listed on the National Register of Historic Places: three were listed individually in 1982 and 1983, and the group of four was listed as a historic district on July 11, 1985.

See also
National Register of Historic Places listings in Birmingham, Alabama

References

External links

 

Buildings and structures completed in 1906
Office buildings completed in 1912
Buildings and structures in Birmingham, Alabama
Neoclassical architecture in Alabama
National Register of Historic Places in Birmingham, Alabama
Historic districts in Birmingham, Alabama
Historic American Buildings Survey in Alabama
1906 establishments in Alabama